The molecular formula C4H10O2 may refer to:

 Butanediols
 1,2-Butanediol
 1,3-Butanediol
 1,4-Butanediol
 2,3-Butanediol
 tert-Butyl hydroperoxide
 Dimethoxyethane
 2-Ethoxyethanol
 1-Methoxy-2-propanol
Diethyl peroxide